Anarchist Communist Federation may refer to:

The former name of the Anarchist Federation (Britain)
The Federation of Anarchist Communists in Italy
Zabalaza Anarchist Communist Front in South Africa, formerly called the Zabalaza Anarchist Communist Federation